Phyllodus is an extinct genus of bony fish from the Maastrichtian to Middle Miocene. Fossils of the genus have been found in the Maastrichtian to Lancian Hell Creek Formation and the Eocene London Clay.

See also 
 List of prehistoric bony fish genera

References

Further reading 
 Fossils (Smithsonian Handbooks) by David Ward (Page 215)

Prehistoric bony fish genera
Miocene genus extinctions
Oligocene fish
Eocene fish
Paleocene fish
Late Cretaceous genus first appearances
Cretaceous–Paleogene boundary
Eocene animals of Europe
Late Cretaceous animals of North America
Paleocene animals of North America
Hell Creek fauna